Bulvar Admirala Ushakova is a station on the Butovskaya Line of the Moscow Metro system in Moscow, Russia. It was opened on 27 December 2003 along with four other stations. The station is located in Yuzhnoye Butovo District, between two other stations of the same line, Ulitsa Skobelevskaya and Ulitsa Gorchakova. The station, which name literally means Admiral Ushakov Boulevard, was named after the nearby street, and the street was named after the 18th-century Russian naval commander Fyodor Ushakov.

References

Moscow Metro stations
Railway stations in Russia opened in 2003
Butovskaya Line